Glaucidium may refer to:
 Glaucidium (bird), a genus of pygmy owls in the family Strigidae
 Glaucidium (plant), a genus of plants in the family Ranunculaceae